The Keralolpathi (IAST:kēraḷōlpatti) is a Malayalam Hindu literary work that deals with the origin and legends of the land of Kerala. P. Shungunny Menon ascribes the authorship of this work to Thunchaththu Ramanujan Ezhuthachan, a 17th-century scholar of the Malabar region of India. A. Sreedhara Menon dates the work to 18th or 19th century. The Keralolpathi is mostly an expansion from an earlier Sanskrit work known as the Kerala Mahatmayam.  That work is classed among the Hindu Puranas as an Upa Purana (or sub Purana) of the Bhoogola Purana.

The Keralolpathi covers the ancestry of the Namboodiri Brahmins and other castes of Kerala and is sometimes called the "Kerala Ulpathy". While the "Kerala Mahatmayam" deals with the origin of Kerala and its people alone, the Keralolpathi gives a history of Kerala down to the modern age, including reference to the British in Kerala.

Perumals mentioned in Keralolpathi

Perumals of Keralolpathi
Keyapperumal
Cholapperumal 
Pandipperumal 
Banapperumal
Thulubanperumal 
Indrapperumal 
Aryapperumal
Kundranperumal
Kottipperumal 
Madapperumal 
Ezhipperumal 
Kombanperumal
Vijayanperumal
Valabanperumal 
Harichandranperumal
Mallapperumal 
Kulasekharapperumal

Criticisms

Historians doubt the reliability of this collection of legends as it contains many discrepancies. For instance it states that a certain Viceroy of Kerala went to Mecca and met the Islamic prophet Muhammed there. However the corresponding date mentioned is such that the prophet was not even born till more than a century later. It also mentions that the King Krishnadevaraya of the Vijayanagara empire appointed a Viceroy over Kerala in 428 AD. However the said king reigned between 1509 and 1529 AD.

Likewise even the origins of most of the castes and clans of Kerala varies from the ancient Sanskrit Kerala Mahatmayam. Besides, by the 18th century modified versions of the work started appearing, varying from kingdom to kingdom and region to region in Kerala.  Therefore, according to Shungunny Menon (a native historian of Travancore, Kerala) one cannot place, in the Keralolpathi, the value of a historical source. Shungunny Menon, stated that: 

William Logan, who was the author of the Malabar Manual also refutes the validity of the Keralolpathi and describes it as: 

K.P. Padmanabha Menon, another native historian calls the Keralolpathi:

See also
 Parasurama
 Nair

External links
Keralolpathi: The Origin of Malabar at the Internet Archive

References

Hindu texts
Indian chronicles